Cody Mark Carroll (born October 15, 1992) is an American professional baseball pitcher who is currently a free agent. He previously played in Major League Baseball (MLB) for the Baltimore Orioles. He made his MLB debut in 2018.

Career

Amateur career
Carroll attended Mount Juliet High School in Mount Juliet, Tennessee. He played college baseball at the University of Southern Mississippi. He majored in liberal studies.

New York Yankees
The New York Yankees selected Carroll in the 22nd round of the 2015 Major League Baseball draft. He made his professional debut in 2015 with the Pulaski Yankees and spent the whole season there, pitching to a 1–1 record and 1.75 ERA in  innings pitched.

Carroll pitched in 2016 with the Charleston RiverDogs, going 4–4 with a 3.15 ERA in  innings, and in 2017 with both the Tampa Yankees and Trenton Thunder, posting a combined 3–5 record and 2.54 ERA with 89 strikeouts in  total innings pitched between the two teams. After the 2017 season, he played in the Arizona Fall League.

Baltimore Orioles
On July 24, 2018, the Yankees traded Carroll, Dillon Tate, and Josh Rogers to the Baltimore Orioles for Zack Britton. Carroll was promoted to the majors for the first time on July 31, 2018. He made his debut the next day.

Carroll was out for most of the 2019 season with a back injury. In 2020 he broke camp with the Orioles after the resumption of play in July. He made two appearances before being sent to the teams alternate camp; he was recalled as an extra man on  August 14 and returned the next day. On September 21, 2020, Carroll was outrighted off of the 40-man roster.

In 2021, Carroll made 22 appearances for the Triple-A Norfolk Tides. He had a 5.57 ERA with 23 strikeouts. On August 2, 2021, Carroll was released by the Orioles.

Miami Marlins
On August 24, 2021, Carroll signed a minor league contract with the Miami Marlins. Carroll made 3 appearances for the Triple-A Jacksonville Jumbo Shrimp, posting a 6.00 ERA and 6 strikeouts. He became a free agent following the season.

San Francisco Giants
On February 10, 2022, Carroll signed a minor league contract with the San Francisco Giants. He was released on August 23, 2022.

References

External links

1992 births
Living people
People from Mount Juliet, Tennessee
Baseball players from Tennessee
Major League Baseball pitchers
Baltimore Orioles players
Southern Miss Golden Eagles baseball players
Pulaski Yankees players
Charleston RiverDogs players
Tampa Yankees players
Trenton Thunder players
Scottsdale Scorpions players
Scranton/Wilkes-Barre RailRiders players
Gulf Coast Orioles players
Norfolk Tides players
Surprise Saguaros players
Jupiter Hammerheads players
Pensacola Blue Wahoos players
Jacksonville Jumbo Shrimp players